Jacka Glacier is a  long glacier which flows northeast from Hayter Peak and terminates in icefalls opposite Vanhoffen Bluff on the north side of Heard Island in the southern Indian Ocean. The glacier appears to be roughly charted on an 1860 sketch map compiled by Captain H.C. Chester, an American sealer operating in the area during this period. It was surveyed in 1948 by the Australian National Antarctic Research Expeditions, and named by them for Fred J. Jacka, an expedition physicist.

See also
 List of glaciers in the Antarctic
 Glaciology

References

External links
 Map of Heard Island and McDonald Islands, including all major topographical features

Glaciers of Heard Island and McDonald Islands